Secondary Highway 510, commonly referred to as Highway 510, is a provincially maintained highway in the Canadian province of Ontario. It was established in 1956, along with most of the secondary highway system in the province, and is little changed since then.

Route description 
Highway 510 is a short secondary highway in Parry Sound District which follows the Nipissing Colonization Road north from the village of Magnetawan to Highway 124. It is lightly travelled, with an average of 220 vehicles travelling it per day in 2016.

At its southern end the highway meets Highway 520, which also connects with Highway 124 to the northwest. It curves north between exposed rock formations and is promptly surrounded by forests. The undulating highway curves several times as it passes by the occasional residence or summer cottage. The route curves northeast to avoid a large muskeg. It curves northwest around the muskeg as Arrow Drive, an old alignment of the highway, diverges to the west. After passing back into the forest, it curves to the north. The old Nipissing Colonization Road continues north.

History 
Highway 510 is one of several dozen secondary highways designated at the beginning of 1956.
The highway is little changed since it was designated, and was unaffected by highway downloading in the late-1990s.

Major intersections 
The following table lists the major junctions along Highway 510. The entirety of the highway is in Parry Sound District.

{| class=wikitable
!scope=col|Location
!scope=col|km
!scope=col|Destinations
!scope=col|Notes
|-
|rowspan="2"|Magnetawan
|0.0
|
|
|-
|2.8
|
|

References 

510